Boulder County Poor Farm is the site of a poor farm in Boulder County, Colorado, where long-term care for the county's indigent was provided from 1902 to 1918.   The site was operating as a farm from 1897, and many of the original farm buildings are still present, including a main house built in Queen Anne style.  It was listed on the National Register of Historic Places in 2011.

Starting in 1875, Boulder County leased a series of properties to serve as the county poorhouse.   In 1902, the  farm on today's 63rd Street was purchased to house the institution; many modifications were made to the farm house, including the construction of a two-story dormitory annex.  By 1918, a larger building was needed, and the institution was moved to another location. The farm was sold and returned to private operation.

References

Buildings and structures in Boulder County, Colorado
Poor farms
Residential buildings on the National Register of Historic Places in Colorado
National Register of Historic Places in Boulder County, Colorado